Our Mrs. McChesney is a lost 1918 American silent comedy-drama film produced and distributed by Metro Pictures, directed by Ralph Ince, and based on the 1915 play by Edna Ferber and George V. Hobart which starred Ethel Barrymore.

Barrymore reprised her role from the popular play, as did her fellow cast members Huntley Gordon and William H. St. James. Wilfred Lytell was a brother of Bert Lytell and Lucille Lee Stewart was a sister of Anita Stewart. Ince was married to Lucille Lee Stewart.

Plot
As described in a film magazine, Emma McChesney (Barrymore), saleswoman for T. A. Buck & Co., plans to give up the "road" and settle down with her boy Jack (Lytell). She discovers that Jack has married a chorus girl while at college and also raised a check that she had sent him. Determined to make a man of him, she secures a position for him at T. A. Buck & Co. and sends the daughter-in-law to a boarding school. She designs a new skirt for the company that finds favor at a fashion show when modeled by Jack's wife, and saves the company from bankruptcy.

Cast
Ethel Barrymore as Emma McChesney
Huntley Gordon as T. A. Buck Jr.
Wilfred Lytell as Jack McChesney
Lucille Lee Stewart as Vera Sherwood
John Daly Murphy as Abel Fromkin
Walter Percival as 'Beauty' Blair
William H. St. James as 'Fat' Ed Myers
Ricca Allen as Hattie Stitch
George S. Trimble as Joe Greenbaum
Sammy Cooper as Izzy Greenbaum (*Samuel Colt; son of Ethel Barrymore)
Fred Walters as Sam Harrison

See also
List of lost films
Ethel Barrymore on stage, screen and radio

References

External links

Our Mrs. McChesney at SilentEra

Period advertisement to the film
Sequences from the film: photo #1 (still incorrectly listed as The Beloved Rogue), photo #2

1918 films
American silent feature films
American films based on plays
Films directed by Ralph Ince
Lost American films
Metro Pictures films
1918 comedy-drama films
1910s English-language films
American black-and-white films
Films based on works by Edna Ferber
1918 lost films
Lost comedy-drama films
1910s American films
Silent American comedy-drama films